Kesa Van Osch (born December 12, 1991 in Nanaimo, British Columbia) is a Canadian curler from Parksville, British Columbia. She was the skip of the winning team at the 2014 British Columbia Scotties Tournament of Hearts, and finished 5th in the 2014 Scotties Tournament of Hearts.

Van Osch also represented British Columbia at the 2012 Canadian Junior Curling Championships where she led her team to a third-place finish.

Teams

References

External links 
 

Canadian women curlers
1991 births
Curlers from British Columbia
Living people
Sportspeople from Nanaimo
People from Parksville, British Columbia